Ane Grethe Antonsen (1855–1930) was a Danish actress from Jutland. After training under Lauritz Eckardt, she made her debut in May 1880 at the Royal Danish Theatre as Ulrikka in Carsten Hauch's Søstrene paa Kinnekullen (The Sisters at Kinnekullen). She continued as a stage actress performing in the repertoire at the Royal Theatre for almost 30 years. In 1910, she turned to the cinema, acting in silent films, the first of which was Elskovsbarnet.

Biography
Born on 25 June 1855 in Over Barrit near Juelsminde, Ane Grethe Antonsen was the daughter of the farmer Anton Rasmussen (1819–1894) and his wife Ellen Rasmusdatter (1821–1902). Despite little schooling, she moved to Copenhagen where she quickly became interested in the theatre. Making great efforts to lose her provincial accent, she was instructed by Lauritz Eckardt.

Antonsen made her debut at the Royal Theatre on 6 May 1880 as Ulkikka in Hauch's Søstrene paa Kinnekullen. After taking a number of tragic roles with limited success, she went on to perform solid, sometimes comic female roles such as Gina in Ibsen's Vildanden (1884), Kristine Linde in his Et Dukkehjem, and Ane, the confused maid, in Bjørnstjerne Bjørnson's Geografi og Kærlighed (1895). In more traditional repertoire roles, she played Gedske Klokkers in Holberg's Barselstuen and Madam Rar in Johan Ludvig Heiberg's Aprilsnarrene. In 1910, after playing Frk. Fenger in Hjalmar Bergstrøm's Dame-The, she retired from the Royal Theatre. The same year she performed in the silent films Elskovsbarnet and Et gensyn and later in Det falske spil (1911) and Pigen fra det mørke København (1912). Thereafter she made occasional appearances on the stage at the Dagmar Teatret and Folketeatret.

Ane Grethe Antonsen died in Sorø on 9 January 1930. As she had no heirs, she created a foundation for old performing artists.

Filmography
 1910	Elskovsbarnet as Vicomtens kone
 1910	Et gensyn as Professorens hustru
 1911	Dæmonen as Grevinde Frida von Falkenstein
 1912	Pigen fra det mørke København

Theatre roles

Royal Danish Theatre	
 1879	En skærsommernatsdrøm as Hippolita
 1880	Søstrene paa Kinnekullen as Ulrikka
 1882	En skærsommernatsdrøm as Hippolita
 1884	Den stundesløse as Ane, kokkepige
 1884	Den politiske kandestøber as Arianke Grovsmeds
 1884	Hamlet as Dronningen
 1884	Ulysses von Ithacia as Penelope, Ulysses gemalinde
 1887	Hamlet as Dronningen
 1887	Maskerade as Kone i maskeradeklæder
 1888	Barselstuen as Gedske Klokkers
 1888	Det lykkelige skibbrud as Frue
 1888	Scapins skalkestykker as	Nerine, Hyacinthes amme
 1891	Hedda Gabler as Berte
 1895	Lille Eyolf as Rottejomfruen
 1900	Naar vi døde vaagner as Dikonisse
 1901	Ulysses von Ithacia as Pallas
 1903	Bygmester Solness as Aline Sollness
 1904	Opstandelse as Matrøna
 1908	Bygmester Solness	Aline Solness

Aarhus Theatre
 1917	Geografi og kærlighed as Malla

References

1855 births
1930 deaths
19th-century Danish actresses
20th-century Danish actresses
People from Horsens
Danish film actresses